The Director of the Royal Greenwich Observatory was the senior scientist responsible for the administration of the Royal Greenwich Observatory from 1972 until the institution's closure in 1998.

History
Executive responsibility for the Royal Observatory, Greenwich, London, 
had rested with the Astronomer Royal from the institution's foundation 
in 1675. This practice continued when the observatory moved to 
Herstmonceux Castle in 1948 and was renamed the Royal Greenwich 
Observatory.

However, the title Astronomer Royal was separated from directorship of 
the observatory after the retirement of Richard Woolley in 1971.
Following this, Margaret Burbidge was appointed Director, and Sir Martin Ryle 
(1918–1984) was appointed Astronomer Royal in an honorary 
capacity. The Astronomer Royal no longer had any association with the 
observatory after this time.

Directors took action to modernise the institution and to establish a 
new observatory on the island of La Palma 
in the Canary Islands. 
The Director oversaw the move of the Royal Greenwich Observatory from Herstmonceux 
to Cambridge in 1990, and continued in charge until the observatory was closed by the 
Particle Physics and Astronomy Research Council in 1998. The post expired with 
the institution.

Holders of the office
The Directors of the Royal Greenwich Observatory as a post distinct from 
Astronomer Royal were:
 1972–1973   Margaret Burbidge
 1973–1975   Alan Hunter (1912–1995)
 1976–1981   Francis Graham Smith
 1981–1995   Alexander Boksenberg
 1995–1998   Jasper Wall

References

Lists of British people
Lists of scientists by membership
Royal Observatory, Greenwich